Diabetes Australia is the third oldest diabetes association in the world, after the United Kingdom and Portugal.  Originally established in the state of New South Wales (NSW) in 1937, the organisation's head office is now in the nation's capital, Canberra. In 2021 the members of Diabetes NSW & ACT, Diabetes Queensland and Diabetes Tasmania voted to unify with Diabetes Australia. The Australian Diabetes Society and the Australian Diabetes Educators Association are also members. 

Diabetes Australia is a not-for-profit organisation supported financially by the community. In addition to its original mandate as an extended support group, Diabetes Australia raises funds to invest in research, health services, provision of self–management products and services, and public awareness programs. It also facilitates the development of national policies about diabetes.

Diabetes Australia has delivered the National Diabetes Services Scheme since the Scheme was established in 1987.

Statement of purpose
Diabetes Australia works in partnership with diabetes health professionals, educators and researchers to minimise the impact of diabetes on the Australian community. Diabetes Australia is committed to turning diabetes around through awareness, prevention, detection, management and a cure.

Diabetes Australia raises awareness about the seriousness of diabetes, promotes prevention and early detection strategies and advocates for better standards of care. Diabetes Australia is also a significant financial contributor to research into better treatments for diabetes and the search for a cure.

Publications and research
Diabetes Australia is involved in two publications, one for medical specialists, and another for the broader public.

Circle is a quarterly magazine covering health and welfare issues for people with diabetes, and available through membership of Diabetes Australia including state and territory based member-organisations.  Circulation is around 140,000.

Diabetes Management Journal (DMJ) is a free magazine containing information and advice for general practitioners, endocrinologists, diabetes educators, optometrists and podiatrists, who receive it through their professional associations. Its circulation is around 40,000.

In November 2022, the organisation released a report called Change the Future: Reducing the impact of the diabetes epidemic which highlights a number of looming challenges in Australia's diabetes epidemic.

See also

 Diabetes Australia Victoria
 Diabetes NSW & ACT

References

External links
Diabetes Australia

Medical and health organisations based in Australia
Diabetes organizations
1937 establishments in Australia
Organizations established in 1937